René Casados Morales  is a Mexican actor best known for his roles in telenovelas.

Biography
Casados began working as an actor in the 1970s, appearing in films, television, and theatre, as well as working as a co-host of the program XE-TU with Erika Buenfil.  As of February 2010, he has appeared in nineteen telenovelas (Spanish-language soap operas), most notably La madrastra as Bruno Mendizábal and Fuego en le sangre as Father Tadeo.

Casados married Rosa Adriana Ojeda, whom he met at the age of thirteen; the couple has two daughters, Kukene and Triana.

Filmography

Television
Corazón guerrero (2022)... Heriberto Villalba
Mi fortuna es amarte (2022)... Heliodoro Flores
¿Qué le pasa a mi familia? (2021) - Wenceslao Rueda Cortés
Juntos el corazón nunca se equivoca (2019) - Audifaz Córcega 
Mi marido tiene familia (2017-2019) - Audifaz Córcega
Las Amazonas (2016) - Eduardo Mendoza Castro
Mi Corazón Es Tuyo (2014) - Bruno Romero
La tempestad (2013) - Claudio Salvatore Petrone
Abismo de pasion (2012) - Father Guadalupe "Lupe" Mondragón  
Cuando me enamoro (2010) - Gonzalo Monterrubio
Glam Girls (2009)
Mujeres asesinas (2009)
Corazón salvaje (2009) — Noel Vidal
Fuego en la sangre (2008) — Father Tadeo
Mundo de fieras (2006) — Nicolás Navarro
La madrastra (2005) — Bruno Mendizábal
Corazones al límite (2004) — Dante Lacalfari
Amarte es mi pecado (2004) — Juan Carlos Orellana
Clase 406 (2002) Telenovela — Manolo Cayetano Catasús
María Belén (2001) Telenovela — Jorge
Abrázame muy fuerte (2000) Telenovela — Francisco José Bravo/Fernando Joaquín
Ramona (2000) — Angus O'Faill
Tres mujeres (1999) .... Leonardo Marcos
Ángela (1998) — Alfonso Molina
Preciosa (1998) — El Gran Sabú
La jaula de oro  (1997) — Flavio Canet
La antorcha encendida (1996) — Agustín de Itúrbide
Dos vidas (1988) — Dino
XE-TU (1982-1987)
Extraños caminos del amor (1981) — Miguel
Muchacha de barrio (1979) — Ernesto
La hora del silencio (1978)

Film
Mejor es que Gabriela no se muera (2007) — Abigail
Se me sale cuando me río (1983)
El testamento (1980)
El tonto que hacia milagros (1980)
El sexo me da risa (1978)
Pedro Páramo (1978)
El fantasma del lago(1977)
La guera Rodríguez (1977)
La hora del jaguar (1977)
La leyenda de Rodrígo (1977)
El rediezcubrimiento de México (1977)
La viuda negra (1977)

Theatre
 Gran musical (2003)
 Aborto canta a la vida (1988)

References

External links
René Casados at the Internet Movie Database
René Casados at Alma-Latina

Living people
Mexican male television actors
Mexican male film actors
Mexican male stage actors
Mexican male telenovela actors
People from Veracruz (city)
Male actors from Veracruz
Year of birth missing (living people)
20th-century Mexican male actors
21st-century Mexican male actors